Oakdale Township may refer to:

 Oakdale Township, Washington County, Illinois
 Oakdale Township, Antelope County, Nebraska

Township name disambiguation pages